Me, Me, Me... and the Others is a 1966 Italian comedy film directed by Alessandro Blasetti. For this film Blasetti won the David di Donatello for best director.

Plot

Cast
 Gina Lollobrigida - Titta
 Silvana Mangano - Silvia
 Walter Chiari - Sandro
 Vittorio De Sica - Commendator Trepossi
 Nino Manfredi - 'Millevache'
 Marcello Mastroianni - Peppino Marassi
 Caterina Boratto - Luigia, Peppino's Sister-in-law
 Vittorio Caprioli - Politician
 Elisa Cegani - Peppino's Housekeeper
 Andrea Checchi - Praying Man
 Umberto D'Orsi - Man in Train
 Graziella Granata - Girl on the Train
 Marisa Merlini - Lady on the telephone
 Paolo Panelli - Photographer
 Mario Pisu - Winner of the 'Capranica'
 Salvo Randone - Traveller with a menu
 Luisa Rivelli - Lady dancing
 Maria Grazia Spina - Peppino's Niece
 Saro Urzì - 2nd Praying Man
 Franca Valeri - Journalist
 Sylva Koscina - The 'Star'
 Marina Malfatti - Dancer
 Mario Scaccia - Journalist
 Lelio Luttazzi - Director 
 Carlo Croccolo - Man in Train

References

External links

1966 films
1966 comedy films
1960s Italian-language films
Italian black-and-white films
Films set in Rome
Commedia all'italiana
Films directed by Alessandro Blasetti
Films scored by Carlo Rustichelli
Films with screenplays by Suso Cecchi d'Amico
1960s Italian films